Sherzan is a surname. Notable people with the surname include:

Gary Sherzan (born 1944), American politician in the state of Iowa
Richard Sherzan (born 1946), American politician in the state of Iowa, brother of above